Laroussi Mizouri (born May 6, 1950) is a Tunisian politician.  He was appointed minister of religious affairs in the government of Mohamed Ghannouchi.

See also
 Ghannouchi II Cabinet

References

Living people
People of the Tunisian Revolution
1950 births
Place of birth missing (living people)